David William Steadman is a paleontologist and ornithologist, and serves as the curator of ornithology at the Florida Museum of Natural History at the University of Florida.

His research has concentrated on the evolution, biogeography, conservation, and extinction of tropical birds, particularly in the islands of the Pacific Ocean. He has also authored over 180 scientific publications. He has conducted a number of digs at prehistoric sites and uncovered widescale extinctions caused by humans in the early stages of colonisation. He has conducted several expeditions to the Galápagos Islands, and has described a number of extinct species of birds and more recently was involved in discovering that the Solomon Islands frogmouth is a species (instead of a subspecies of the marbled frogmouth, as formerly believed). He worked extensively on Easter Island, carrying out the first systematic excavations of the island in order to identify the plants and animals that once lived there.

Education
 Bachelor's degree in Biology from Edinboro State College in 1973.
 Master's degree in Zoology from the University of Florida in 1975.
 Doctorate in Geosciences from the University of Arizona in 1982.

References

Year of birth missing (living people)
Living people
American ornithologists
University of Florida College of Agricultural and Life Sciences alumni
University of Florida faculty